Eulis Báez (born March 18, 1982) is a Dominican professional basketball player for Real Betis of the Spanish Liga ACB. He competes internationally with the Dominican Republic national basketball team, and has appeared in various events, including the 2011 FIBA Americas Championship and 2014 FIBA Basketball World Cup. Báez played college basketball with three college teams spanning from 2002 to 2005: Florida International, Southeastern Iowa Community College, and Western Illinois.

Báez spent the 2020-21 season with Manresa, averaging 6.5 points and 2.9 rebounds per game. On November 29, 2021, he signed with Real Betis.

References

External links
Eulis Báez at acb.com 

1982 births
Living people
2014 FIBA Basketball World Cup players
2019 FIBA Basketball World Cup players
Baloncesto León players
Bàsquet Manresa players
CB Gran Canaria players
CB Valladolid players
CB Vic players
Dominican Republic expatriate basketball people in Spain
Dominican Republic expatriate basketball people in the United States
Dominican Republic men's basketball players
FIU Panthers men's basketball players
Joventut Badalona players
Liga ACB players
Power forwards (basketball)
Real Betis Baloncesto players
Small forwards
Southeastern Blackhawks men's basketball players
Sportspeople from Santo Domingo
Western Illinois Leathernecks men's basketball players